The AARP Movies for Grownups Award for Best Movie for Grownups Who Refuse to Grow Up was one of the AARP Movies for Grownups Awards presented annually by the AARP. The award honored the best film in a given year that, while targeted at people below the age of 50, could still be enjoyed by an older audience. The award is one of the seven original trophies issued by AARP the Magazine, along with awards for Best Movie for Grownups, Best Director, Best Actor, Best Actress, Best Foreign Film, and Best Documentary. The award was discontinued after the 16th AARP Movies for Grownups Awards in 2017.

Winners and Nominees

2000s

2010s

References

Movie for Grownups Who Refuse to Grow Up